The 1921–22 Lancashire Cup competition, the fourteenth contest for this regional rugby league competition, saw a new name on the trophy, Warrington. They beat Oldham in the final at The Cliff, Broughton, Salford  by a score of 7-5. The final was watched by 18,000 and receipts were £1,200.

Background 
The number of teams entering this year’s competition remained at the previous level of 14, this enabled the competition to be run with only 2 byes in the first round.

Competition and results

Round 1  
Involved  6 matches (with two byes) and 14 clubs

Round 2 – quarterfinals

Round 3 – semifinals

Final

Teams and scorers 

Scoring - Try = three (3) points - Goal = two (2) points - Drop goal = two (2) points

The road to success

See also 
1921–22 Northern Rugby Football Union season

Notes 
 1 The Willows was the home ground of Salford

References

RFL Lancashire Cup
Lancashire Cup